Thomas Jonathan  Ossoff (born February 16, 1987) is an American politician serving as the senior United States senator from Georgia since 2021. A member of the Democratic Party, Ossoff was previously a documentary filmmaker and investigative journalist.

Born in Atlanta to a Jewish father and an Australian mother, Ossoff was the Democratic nominee in the 2017 special election for Georgia's 6th congressional district, which had long been considered a Republican stronghold. The special election proved competitive. It generated national attention, and became the most expensive House election in U.S. history. Ossoff narrowly lost the race to former Georgia Secretary of State Karen Handel.

In 2020, Ossoff won the Democratic nomination for the 2020 U.S. Senate election in Georgia to run against then-incumbent Republican senator David Perdue. Neither candidate reached the 50 percent threshold on the November 3 general election, triggering a runoff election on January 5, 2021, which Ossoff won. Ossoff serves alongside fellow Democrat Raphael Warnock, who defeated incumbent Republican Kelly Loeffler in the 2020 Senate special election runoff, also on January 5, 2021. The two races attracted significant national attention and spending, as they decided which party would control the Senate in the 117th Congress. Warnock and Ossoff's victories helped the Democrats attain a 50–50 split in the Senate, which made an effective majority due to the tie-breaking vote of the Vice President, Kamala Harris. He took office on January 20, 2021, ultimately becoming the senior senator from Georgia.

With his victory, Ossoff became the youngest member of the Senate elected since Don Nickles in 1980 as well as the first Jewish member of the Senate from Georgia, the first Jewish senator from the Deep South since Benjamin F. Jonas of Louisiana, who was elected in 1878, the first born in the 1980s, and the first millennial United States senator. Warnock and Ossoff are the first Democrats to represent Georgia in the United States Senate since Zell Miller in 2005.

Early life and education
Ossoff was born on February 16, 1987, in Atlanta, Georgia. He was raised in Northlake, an unincorporated community. Ossoff's mother, Heather Fenton, is an Australian immigrant who was born and raised in Sydney and immigrated to the United States at the age of 23. She co-founded NewPower PAC, an organization that works to elect women to local office across Georgia. His father, Richard Ossoff, who is of Russian Jewish and Lithuanian Jewish descent, owns Strafford Publications, a specialist publishing company. Ossoff was raised Jewish and, due to his mother being a gentile, formally converted to the religion prior to his bar mitzvah. His ancestors fled pogroms in the early 20th century, and he noted in an interview that he grew up among Holocaust survivor relatives and detailed how this greatly influenced him and his worldviews. He previously held dual Australian citizenship through his mother.

He attended The Paideia School, an independent school in Atlanta. While in high school, he interned for civil rights leader and U.S. representative John Lewis. In 2009, Ossoff graduated from Georgetown University's Walsh School of Foreign Service with a Bachelor of Science degree. He attended classes taught by former U.S. secretary of state Madeleine Albright and former Israeli ambassador to the United States Michael Oren. He earned a Master of Science degree in international political economy from the London School of Economics in 2013.

Early career 
After receiving a recommendation from John Lewis, Ossoff worked as a national security staffer and legislative assistant for foreign affairs and defense policy for U.S. representative Hank Johnson from 2007 to 2012. From 2013 to 2021, Ossoff was the managing director and chief executive officer of Insight: The World Investigates (TWI), a London-based investigative television production company that works with reporters to create documentaries about corruption in foreign countries. The firm produced BBC investigations about ISIS war crimes and death squads in East Africa. Ossoff was involved in producing a documentary about the staging of a play in Sierra Leone. Ossoff had previously received an inheritance of an unknown amount from his grandfather, a former co-owner of a Massachusetts leather factory, of which he used $250,000 to co-fund Insight: TWI alongside company founder and former BBC reporter Ron McCullagh, who first met Ossoff when he was 16-years-old during a family vacation to France and with whom he kept in contact afterward.

2017 U.S. House campaign

After learning that Republican Tom Price of Georgia's 6th congressional district had been appointed secretary of health and human services by president-elect Donald Trump, Ossoff announced his candidacy for the special election on January 5, 2017. Ossoff quickly emerged as the most viable Democratic candidate out of a large field of candidates. He was endorsed by congressmen Hank Johnson and John Lewis, and state House Democratic leader Stacey Abrams. He also received public support from U.S. senator and Democratic presidential candidate Bernie Sanders. Ossoff raised over $8.3 million by early April of that year.

According to The Atlanta Journal-Constitution, Ossoff "transformed what was expected to be a quiet battle for a long-safe Republican seat into a proxy fight over Trump, the health care overhaul, and the partisan struggle for suburbia". When he entered the race, the Cook Partisan Voting Index rated Georgia's 6th congressional district at R+14; the district was not considered competitive, and had been represented in Congress by Republicans since 1978. Less than two months before Ossoff's announcement, Price had been re-elected in a landslide, with 62 percent of the vote.

Ossoff grew up in what is now the 6th district, where his family still resides, although as of the election, he lived about  outside the district's boundaries in the neighboring 4th district. He said he only lived in the 4th temporarily so that his girlfriend, now wife, who was then an Emory University medical student, could walk to work. Members of the House are required only to live in the state they represent. The two became engaged during the campaign.

On April 18, 2017, no candidate received 50 percent of the vote in the blanket primary. Ossoff led with about 48.1 percent of the vote, Republican candidate Karen Handel received 19.8 percent, while the remainder of votes were scattered for 16 other candidates. Because no candidate secured an absolute majority, the two leading candidates, Ossoff and Handel, competed in a runoff election on June 20, 2017. Ossoff won all but 1 percent of the Democratic vote, while the Republican vote was more heavily split. Republicans collectively won 51.2 percent of the overall vote.

Ossoff broke national fundraising records for a U.S. House candidate. In total, his campaign raised more than $23 million, two-thirds of which was contributed by small-dollar donors nationwide. His opponent, Handel, and national Republican groups attacked him for raising significant small-dollar contributions from outside of Georgia, although Handel's campaign received the bulk of its support from super PACs and other outside groups, including those funded anonymously by so-called "dark money". Combined spending by the campaigns and outside groups on their behalf added up to over $55 million, which was the most expensive House election in U.S. history. During the campaign, Republican strategy focused on connecting him to Democratic minority leader Nancy Pelosi, regarded as a polarising and unpopular figure by Republicans; Ossoff declined to say whether he would, if elected, support Pelosi for Speaker.

In the June 20 runoff, Ossoff was defeated by Handel, 51.78 to 48.22 percent. According to Atlanta Magazine, "while his percentage of the total vote remained steady from April to now, Ossoff garnered 32,220 more votes in those three months, a 34 percent increase ... Ossoff and his allies might have scooped up nearly every Democrat vote there was to get—and it still wasn't enough to overcome the GOP's numerical advantage." The New York Times reported that he "produced probably the strongest Democratic turnout in an off-year election in at least a decade", "brought a surprising number of irregular young and nonwhite voters to the polls," and nearly doubled youth turnout in the 6th district from the 2014 midterm election. However, according to The Atlanta Journal-Constitution, "surging Democratic turnout wasn't enough to overcome heavy GOP voting in a district where Republicans far outnumber Democrats". Following reports of the election results, Frank Bruni, in an op-ed for The New York Times, characterized the race as "demoralizing for Democrats". This was as close as a Democrat had come to winning this district since it assumed its current configuration as a northern suburban district in 1992; Democratic challengers had won more than 40 percent of the vote only twice before.

On February 23, 2018, Ossoff announced he would not seek the seat in the regular election in 2018; the seat was won by Democrat Lucy McBath in November 2018.

U.S. Senate

Elections

2020–2021 election 

Ossoff ran in the Democratic primary election to unseat then-incumbent Republican senator David Perdue in the 2020 Senate election in Georgia. On June 10, Ossoff advanced to the general election by winning 53 percent of the vote. In July 2020, Perdue's campaign ran a Facebook advertisement in which Ossoff's nose was digitally altered to be larger, which Ossoff criticized as "one of the most classic anti-Semitic tropes". Perdue's campaign said that Perdue had not seen the image and that the widening and elongation of his nose was done by a vendor. The Perdue campaign pulled the advertisement.
 
By October 2020, Ossoff raised over $100 million for his campaign, making him the best-funded Senate candidate in U.S. history.

In the November 3 general election, Perdue received 2,462,617 votes (49.73%), while Ossoff received 2,374,519 votes (47.95%). Since no candidate received a majority of the vote on November 3, the top two finishers (Perdue and Ossoff) advanced to a January 5, 2021 runoff election.

The closing argument of the Ossoff campaign focused on the $2,000 stimulus payments that he and Raphael Warnock would approve if they were to win their elections and give Democrats a majority in the Senate.

Ossoff declared victory on the morning of January 6, 2021, and most major news outlets called the race for him later that day. While Perdue won more counties, Ossoff won overwhelmingly in the inner ring of the Atlanta metropolitan area. He won Cobb and Gwinnett counties, which have recently swung Democratic, by over 40,200 and 74,200 votes, respectively. The latter exceeded his statewide margin of about 55,000 votes. He ran slightly behind Warnock, who defeated Kelly Loeffler by 70,400 votes by also running up his margins in the Atlanta area. Perdue conceded the election on January 8.

The vote was certified on January 19, which allowed the newly elected senators to take office the following day. On January 20, Ossoff was sworn into the Senate by the Vice President Kamala Harris.

When Ossoff took office, he became the first Jewish senator from Georgia and the first Jewish senator elected from the Deep South since Benjamin F. Jonas of Louisiana in 1878, the first senator born in the 1980s, and, at 33, the youngest member of the chamber and the first millennial senator to be elected. He was sworn into office using the Bible of Rabbi Jacob Rothschild, the late rabbi of the Hebrew Benevolent Congregation Temple in Atlanta, which was bombed in 1958 by white supremacists for Rothschild's civil rights activism. Ossoff had his Bar Mitzvah at the Temple.

Ossoff is the first Democrat elected to a full term in the Senate from Georgia since Max Cleland in 1996. He and Warnock are the first Democratic U.S. senators from Georgia since Zell Miller left office in 2005. Ossoff assumed the role of senior U.S. senator from Georgia once he was sworn into office, making him the youngest senior senator since Robert M. La Follette Jr. and the most junior senior senator since Hiram Fong, who was 99th in seniority from Hawaii's admission until the end of the 86th Congress in 1961.

Tenure

On January20, 2021, Ossoff was sworn into the United States Senate in the 117th Congress by Vice President Kamala Harris.

Ossoff supported all of President Joe Biden's cabinet nominees. He voted in favor of Avril Haines's nomination for director of national intelligence and General Lloyd Austin's nomination to serve as secretary of defense, as well as the required waiver for Austin to legally hold the position.

On December 3, Ossoff petitioned Secretary of Education Miguel Cardona requesting Morris Brown College, a historically black college which Ossoff pledged to help during his campaign, regain their accreditation after having lost it in 2002 due to "years of financial issues and mismanagement." Accreditation would allow students of the college (50 at the time of the request) to be eligible for federal financial aid. The college's students were granted the ability to apply for federal financial aid by the Department of the Education one week later on December 10, 2021. After Ossoff's petition in December 2021, The school regained accreditation in April 2022.

In January 2022, Ossoff introduced legislation that would ban members of Congress and their spouses from trading stocks.

Committees

Current
 Committee on the Judiciary
 Committee on the Intelligence
 Committee on Homeland Security and Governmental Affairs
Subcommittee on Investigations (Permanent) (Chair)
Committee on Rules and Administration

Previous
 Committee on Banking, Housing, and Urban Affairs (117th Congress)

Caucuses

Political positions
According to The New Yorker in 2017, Ossoff has "progressive positions on women's issues and health care" and "moderate stances on jobs and security". Matthew Yglesias of Vox called his 2017 run for office an "Obama-style campaign", placing himself in the middle between progressive and conservative members within the Democratic Party. According to The Washington Post, the 2017 Ossoff campaign opted not to turn the special election into a referendum on Trump's alleged scandals, but to focus on "policy decisions by the president and congressional Republicans". The Atlanta Journal-Constitution wrote that he "often tried to avoid nationalizing that campaign over fears of losing moderate voters". The New York Times observed that his 2017 campaign distanced itself from the national Democratic Party.

In 2020, The Atlanta Journal-Constitution wrote that Ossoff was "more unapologetic about embracing liberal policy ideas than his Democratic predecessors during past statewide races. And where he once hesitated to hit Trump directly, he now pulls no punches as he seeks to tie Perdue to his White House ally."

Abortion
Ossoff supports abortion rights. He pledged to support only those judges who would uphold Roe v. Wade, and he supports Planned Parenthood. In response to the June 2022 overturning of Roe v. Wade, Ossoff stated that the Supreme Court "stripped American women of autonomy over their most personal health care decisions."

Cannabis legalization 

On the issue of cannabis legalization, Ossoff says "It's past time to legalize, regulate, and tax cannabis – whose prohibition only enriches cartels, bail bondsmen, and the owners of private prisons." Ossoff says that as a member of the Senate he will push for "nationwide legalization" of cannabis, a substance that he says is "much less dangerous than alcohol".

Capital punishment
Ossoff is against the death penalty and supports its abolition.

Criminal justice
Ossoff opposes prison sentencing for nonviolent drug offenses. His website says, "Violent crime, murder, rape, human trafficking, and corruption are rampant, while we spend billions locking up nonviolent drug offenders."

Ossoff opposes both defunding the police, as well as abolishing the U.S. Immigration and Customs Enforcement. He supports task forces to fight organized crime and political corruption, and he wants to establish national standards for the use of force by police. Ossoff has advocated for demilitarizing the police and banning private prisons.

Economy and Financial Regulation 
Ossoff supports reinstating Glass-Steagall, and he supports ending speculative trading. He has supported stimulus spending in the wave of the COVID-19 pandemic. Ossoff supported an additional round of stimulus checks of $1,200 in late 2020. Ossoff supports increasing economic relief for businesses and households affected by COVID-19 pandemic, and believes testing, treatment, and vaccines for COVID-19 should be free. Ossoff voted in favor of the American Rescue Plan Act of 2021, an economic stimulus bill aimed at speeding up the United States' recovery from the economic and health effects of the COVID-19 pandemic and the ongoing recession.

He supports funding infrastructure. He supports financial regulation to restrict unfair practices by overseas competitors.

Education 
His campaign promised to prioritize making education more affordable, while making trade school, vocational training, public colleges free, and supports debt forgiveness.

Environment
He accepts the Scientific opinion on climate change, and has said that "climate change is a threat to our security and prosperity". He supports U.S. participation in the Paris Agreement. He is not in favor of the Green New Deal. Ossoff is pro GHG restrictions, and in 2017, he advocated investigations into failures to enforce environmental laws. He supports protection of endangered species and habitats, and he criticized the Trump administration's rollbacks of environmental standards.

In 2022, U.S. Senator Jon Ossoff blocked a proposed titanium mine in the Okefenokee Swamp after the U.S. Fish and Wildlife Service warned of severe potential damage to the wildlife refuge. The mine was proposed by Twin Pines Minerals LLC in 2018.

Energy 
Ossoff supports renewable energy. He believes human driven climate change is responsible for global warming, and supports investing in clean energy.

Foreign policy

Afghanistan
Ossoff resisted criticizing President Joe Biden for the withdrawal of troops from Afghanistan in August 2021, as other Democratic politicians had at the time, instead stating he was focused on "supporting the State Department and the Department of Defense as they work with limited time to expedite the evacuation" of stranded Americans and American-allied Afghans. Ossoff would condemn the subsequent airport attack in Kabul, which killed 13 American military personnel, stating: "I condemn this cowardly and despicable terrorist attack."

Israel
Ossoff led a group of 25 Democratic senators who called for an immediate ceasefire in a joint statement during the 2021 Israel–Palestine crisis. The statement said: "Israel has the right to defend itself from Hamas' rocket attacks, in a manner proportionate with the threat its citizens are facing." Ossoff has stated Israel's situation holds high importance to him due to him having Orthodox relatives in the country, saying he wishes for "a future where all people in the region live in peace, live in prosperity and have equal rights."

Ossoff supports Israel and providing U.S. military aid.

Saudi Arabia
Ossoff supports blocking arms sales to Saudi Arabia.

Government reform
Ossoff has called for the repeal of "wasteful, anti-competitive special interest subsidies that make it hard for entrepreneurs to raise capital, enter the market, create jobs, and compete with larger firms who have lobbyists in Washington". He has said the government funds "$16 billion in duplicate programs. That can be cut," an assertion that PolitiFact rated "Mostly True". Ossoff refused to accept donations from PACs.

Ossoff supports statehood for the District of Columbia and for Puerto Rico. He is open to term limits for federal judges, and he voted to pass the John R. Lewis Voting Rights Advancement Act and the Freedom to Vote Act in 2022. He opposes the decision in Citizens United v. FEC.

Gun control 
Ossoff has supported various gun control measures, including background checks, red flag laws, and an assault weapons ban. He was endorsed by Everytown for Gun Safety.

Healthcare
Ossoff supports the Affordable Care Act (also known as Obamacare). His health care policy includes three principles: "One, no American should suffer or die from preventable or treatable illness. Two, no one should go broke because they get sick. And three, no business should go under or lay off employees because it can't keep up with health insurance premiums." He does not support pushing for a single-payer health care system, such as Medicare for All. He opposed both the March 2017 and May 2017 versions of the American Health Care Act, the House Republican bill that would have repealed the Affordable Care Act. He said that the May 2017 version was worse than the earlier one "because it does even less to protect those with pre-existing conditions". He supports improving and redesigning the ACA.

Ossoff told The Atlanta Journal-Constitution that he supported tax credits for small businesses related to health care. He supports Medicaid and Medicare funding, and he wants to empower Medicare to negotiate lower drug prices while expanding Medicaid and investing in new public health clinics. He supports a public option over a single-payer healthcare system.

Immigration
Ossoff supports comprehensive immigration reform that would both strengthen enforcement along the Mexican border and provide a path to citizenship for some undocumented immigrants. He opposes Trump's border wall, but he maintains his support for strengthening borders while providing a path for DREAMers.

LGBT rights
Ossoff describes his support for the LGBT community as "unwavering". He also supports the Equality Act, which would prohibit discrimination on the basis of sex, gender identity, and sexual orientation.

Minimum wage
Ossoff supports raising the federal minimum wage to at least $15 an hour.

Social Security 
Ossoff supports strengthening and protecting Social Security benefits.

Tax reform 
Ossoff supports taxing to balance the budget, and he has advocated for undoing Trump-era tax cuts. He wants to reduce the tax burden for small businesses and simplify family living by lowering taxes on all but the wealthiest Americans. He opposes an increase in current federal income tax rates.

Trump administration
Ossoff has been sharply critical of President Donald Trump, criticizing what he calls Trump's "divisive approach to government", in addition to his COVID policies, and saying: "I have great respect for the office. I don't have great personal admiration for the man himself." After Trump sent out a tweet the day before Ossoff's primary on April 19, 2017, calling him a "super Liberal Democrat" who wanted to "protect criminals, allow illegal immigration and raise taxes," Ossoff dismissed Trump's claims and called him "misinformed". FactCheck.org found that Trump's claim was a distortion, and that there was no evidence that Ossoff had ever advocated for any broad-based tax hikes. Nevertheless, Ossoff said that he would be willing to work with Trump on issues of mutual interest, such as infrastructure spending. After Trump's disclosure of classified information to Russia, Ossoff said of impeachment that "I don't think we're there." He called for "a full and transparent and independent assessment of what level of interference there was by Russian intelligence services in the U.S. election. And overseers in Congress and any independent counsel or commission to do so should follow those facts wherever they lead."

Ossoff voted to convict Trump during his second impeachment on the charge of incitement of insurrection following the 2021 United States Capitol attack, joining all Democrats and seven Republicans.

Voting rights
Ossoff supports passage of the John Lewis Voting Rights Act.

Following passage of Georgia's controversial Election Integrity Act of 2021, signed into law by Republican Governor Brian Kemp and passed by the Republican-led state legislature, several businesses from the Major League Baseball organization to the production of Will Smith film Emancipation boycotted the state in protest. In an interview with CNN, Ossoff expressed his displeasure with the bill, while also saying he didn't support the corporate boycotts, stating Georgians "rely upon and hope for and welcome jobs, investment and opportunity."

Public image
Ossoff has been described as able to effectively appeal to young people by using TikTok, the social media app most popular with Generation Z. On the night he was elected to the Senate, Ossoff's posts on Twitter from the previous decade have attracted renewed attention on social media, including several references to Star Wars, the musical group Imagine Dragons, and anime. He is described as the "first Extremely Online senator".

In January 2021, Vogue reported on an "adoring" Instagram account of self-declared "simps" expressing affection toward Ossoff. After Ossoff's election, in July 2021, The Daily Beast reported on an “Ossimp Patrol” on Twitter that monitors “Ossoff simps” on the platform, and replies to their tweets with an ActBlue link prompting to donate to Senator Raphael Warnock’s 2022 reelection campaign, and get out the vote organizations in Georgia and Texas. When shown this by The Daily Beast, Ossoff is said to have "paused for a moment" and "furrowed his brow" before saying he wasn't aware of any of this, but did commend the "great community" he had that supported him during his 2020-21 senate campaign.

Personal life

Ossoff is married to Alisha Kramer, an obstetrics and gynecology resident at Emory University, and a graduate of Georgetown University and Emory University School of Medicine. Ossoff married Kramer in 2017 after 12 years of dating. On the night of Ossoff's election to the United States Senate in January 2021, Kramer was working an overnight shift in Emory University Hospital in Atlanta. They have one daughter, born in December 2021.

Electoral history

U.S. House

U.S. Senate

Filmography

See also
 List of Jewish members of the United States Congress

References

External links
 
 
 Senator Jon Ossoff official U.S. Senate website
 Campaign website 
 
 

|-

|-

|-

|-

1987 births
Living people
20th-century American Jews
21st-century American Jews
21st-century American journalists
21st-century American male writers
21st-century American politicians
Alumni of The Paideia School
Alumni of the London School of Economics
American documentary film producers
American expatriates in England
American investigative journalists
American male television writers
American people of Australian descent
American people of Lithuanian-Jewish descent
American people of Russian-Jewish descent
Candidates in the 2017 United States elections
Democratic Party United States senators from Georgia (U.S. state)
Walsh School of Foreign Service alumni
Georgia (U.S. state) Democrats
Jewish American journalists
Jewish American people in Georgia (U.S. state) politics
Jewish United States senators
People who lost Australian citizenship
Politicians from Atlanta